The Swiss Journal of Palaeontology is a peer-reviewed scientific journal for palaeontology and taxonomy. It was originally established as Schweizerische Paläontologische Abhandlungen in 1874, renaming itself to the current title in 2011. It is published twice yearly.

References

External links
 

English-language journals
Biannual journals
Publications established in 1874
Paleontology journals
Springer Publishing academic journals